Tamil Thai Valthu ("Prayer to Mother Tamil"), also known by the song's incipit, is the state song of the Indian union territory of Puducherry. It was written by famous poet Bharathidasan.

The song was first sung in various tunes. But in the year 1991, music director L. Krishnan set the music and tune for the song, which at present sung mostly. Generally official functions of the Government of Puducherry start with this song and end with "Jana Gana Mana".

Lyrics

See also
 Tamil Thai
 Tamil Thai Valthu
 List of Indian state songs

References

External links
Tamil Thai Valthu (Puducherry)

Puducherry
Indian state songs